Geno may refer to:


People 
Geno (given name), including a list of people with the name
Marián Geňo (born 1984), Czech footballer
Evgeni Malkin (born 1986), Russian ice hockey player nicknamed Geno

Art and entertainment 
"Geno" (song), a 1980 song by Dexys Midnight Runners
Geno (album), a compilation album by Dexys Midnight Runners
 Geno (Super Mario), a fictional character in Super Mario RPG
Geno Studio, a Japanese animation studio
Geno, character in Fortnite Battle Royale

Other uses 
 Geno Biosphere Reserve, Iran

See also
Genos (disambiguation)
Gino (disambiguation)
Gino's (disambiguation)